Snow tires, also known as winter tires, are tires designed for use on snow and ice. Snow tires have a tread design with larger gaps than those on conventional tires, increasing traction on snow and ice. Such tires that have passed a specific winter traction performance test are entitled to display a 3PMSF (Three-Peak Mountain Snow Flake) symbol on their sidewalls. Tires designed for winter conditions are optimized to drive at temperatures below . Some snow tires have metal or ceramic studs that protrude from the tire to increase traction on hard-packed snow or ice. Studs abrade dry pavement, causing dust and creating wear in the wheel path. Regulations that require the use of snow tires or permit the use of studs vary by country in Asia and Europe, and by state or province in North America.

All-season tires have tread gaps that are smaller than snow tires and larger than conventional tires. They are quieter than winter tires on clear roads, but less capable on snow or ice.

Roadway conditions in winter
Snow tires operate on a variety of surfaces, including pavement (wet or dry), mud, ice, or snow. The tread design of snow tires is adapted primarily to allow penetration of the snow into the tread, where it compacts and provides resistance against slippage. The snow strength developed by compaction depends on the properties of the snow, which depend on its temperature and water content—wetter, warmer snow compacts better than dry, colder snow up to a point where the snow is so wet that it lubricates the tire-road interface.

Snow or ice-covered roadways present lower braking and cornering friction, compared to dry conditions. The roadway friction properties of snow, in particular, are a function of temperature. At temperatures below , snow crystals are harder and generate more friction as a tire passes over them than at warmer conditions with snow or ice on the road surface. However, as temperatures rise above , the presence of free water increasingly lubricates the snow or ice and diminishes tire friction. Hydrophilic rubber compounds help create friction in the presence of water or ice.

Dry and moist snow conditions on roadways

Treads

Attributes that can distinguish snow tires from "all-season" and summer tires include:
An open, deep tread, with a high void ratio between rubber and spaces between the solid rubber
Shoulder blocks, a specialized tread design at the outside of the tire tread to increase snow contact and friction
A narrower aspect ratio between the diameter of the tire and the tread width to minimize resistance from the plowing effect of the tire through deeper snow
Hydrophilic rubber compounds that improve friction on wet surfaces
Additional siping, or thin slits in the rubber, that provide more biting edges and improve traction on wet or icy surfaces.
Wet-film conditions on hard-compacted snow or ice require studs or chains.

Studs
Many jurisdictions in Asia, Europe, and North America seasonally allow snow tires with metal or ceramic studs to improve grip on packed snow or ice. Such tires are prohibited in other jurisdictions or during warmer months because of the damage they may cause to road surfaces. The metal studs are fabricated by encapsulating a hard pin in a softer material base, sometimes called the jacket. The pin is often made of tungsten carbide, a very hard high performance ceramic. The softer base is the part that anchors the stud in the rubber of the tire. As the tire wears with use, the softer base wears so that its surface is at about the same level as the rubber, whereas the hard pin wears so that it continues to protrude from the tire. The pin should protrude at least  for the tire to function properly. Snow tires do not eliminate skidding on ice and snow, but they greatly reduce risks.

Studdable tires are manufactured with molded holes on the rubber tire tread. Usually, there are 80 to 100 molded holes per tire for stud insertion. The insertion is done by using a special tool that spreads the rubber hole so that a stud jacket can be inserted and the flange at the bottom of the jacket can be fitted nicely to the bottom of the hole. The metal studs come in specific heights to match the depths of the holes molded into the tire tread based on the tread depths. For this reason, stud metals can only be inserted when the tires have not been driven on. A proper stud insertion results in the metal jacket that is flush with the surface of the tire tread having only the pin part that protrudes.

When studs come into contact with pavements they abrade the asphalt or concrete surface. This can result in creating polluting dust and wear in the wheel path that prevents proper drainage. For this reason, studded tires are banned, at least seasonally, in many jurisdictions.

Tire/snow interactions

The compacted snow develops strength against slippage along a shear plane parallel to the contact area of the tire on the ground. At the same time, the bottom of the tire treads compress the snow on which they are bearing, also creating friction. The process of compacting snow within the treads requires it to be expelled in time for the tread to compact snow anew on the next rotation. The compaction/contact process works both in the direction of travel for propulsion and braking, but also laterally for cornering.

The deeper the snow that the tire rolls through, the higher the resistance encountered by the tire, as it compacts the snow it encounters and plows some of it to either side. At some point on a given angle of uphill pitch, this resistance becomes greater than the resistance to slippage achieved by the tread's contact with the snow and the tires with power begin to slip and spin. Deeper snow means that climbing a hill without spinning the powered wheels becomes more difficult. However, the plowing/compaction effect aids in braking to the extent that it creates rolling resistance.
Tire/snow interactions

Regulations

ASTM International (American Society for Testing and Materials International) is an international standards organization that develops and publishes voluntary consensus technical standards for a wide range of materials, products, systems, and services. The pertinent standard for snow tires is ASTM F1805 – 16, Standard Test Method for Single Wheel Driving Traction in a Straight Line on Snow- and Ice-Covered Surfaces, which assess tire performance on snow and ice. It measures the traction of tires under acceleration in the rolling direction. Tires that pass this test are entitled to display the 3PMSF (Three-Peak Mountain Snow Flake) symbol.

Asia
All prefectures of Japan, except for the southernmost prefecture of Okinawa, have a traffic regulation requiring motorized vehicles to be fitted with winter tires or tire chains when the road is covered by ice or snow. In addition, tire chains must be fitted for all vehicles on rural designated highways in snow country regions when regulated by traffic signs requiring tire chains.

In many prefectures, tread grooves of snow tires are worn off for more than 50% of their original depth, tires must be replaced to meet the legal requirements. Drivers will be fined for failing to comply with the snow tire or tire chains requirements, and checkpoints are in place on major highways.

Nationwide studded tire restrictions in Japan for passenger vehicles came into effect in April 1991, followed by restrictions for commercial trucks in 1993. Studded tires are still legal in Japan, but their usage is restricted by environmental law and it is a criminal offence to operate a vehicle fitted with a studded tire on dry asphalt or concrete.

Europe

As of 2016, regulations pertaining to snow tires in Europe varied by country. The principal aspects of regulations were whether the use was mandatory and whether studded tires were permitted.

Mandatory use – The following countries required snow tires between specified dates or when roads are snowy or icy: Austria, Bosnia-Herzegovina, Croatia, Czechia, Estonia, Finland, Germany, Latvia, Lithuania, Montenegro, Norway, Romania, Serbia, Slovakia, Slovenia, Sweden, and Russia. 
Studded tires banned – The following countries ban the use of studded tires: Albania, Belgium, Bosnia-Herzegovina, Bulgaria, Croatia, Czechia, Germany, Hungary, Luxembourg, North Macedonia, Montenegro, Netherlands, Poland, Portugal, Romania, Serbia, Slovakia, and Slovenia. 
Studded tires restricted – The following allowed the seasonally restricted use of studded tires: Austria, Denmark, Estonia, Finland, France, Great Britain, Iceland, Ireland, Latvia, Lithuania, Norway, Russia, Spain, Sweden, and Switzerland.

North America
The U.S. National Highway Traffic Safety Administration (NHTSA) and Transport Canada allow display of a 3PMSF symbol to indicate that the tire has exceeded the industry requirement from a reference (non-snow) tire. As of 2016, snow tires were 3.6% of the US market and 35% of the Canadian market.

US states and Canadian provinces control the use of snow tires. Quebec is the only state  or province that requires snow tires jurisdiction-wide. They may require snow tires or chains only in certain areas during the winter:
British Columbia – Snow tires are only required by law in certain "designated winter tire & chain-up routes" in mountainous regions. In these areas, motorists must use winter tires or carry tire chains.
Alberta – Banff National Park or Jasper National Park require cars to have snow tires or tire chains between 1 November to 31 March, or any other period during which the road is covered with snow or ice.
Quebec – Winter tires or studded tires must be used from 1 December to 15 March.

The use of studded tires is regulated in the United States and Canada by individual states and provinces, as follows:
Unrestricted use of studded snow tires is allowed in: (United States) Colorado, Kentucky, North Carolina, Vermont, and Wyoming; (Canada) Alberta, Northwest Territories, Saskatchewan, and Yukon
South Carolina – only restriction is studs must be no more than 1/16 of an inch.
Wyoming – chains must be used during snow emergencies.
Studded snow tires may not be used in Hawaii, Mississippi, Puerto Rico, or Southern Ontario. 
Georgia – only during "snow and ice" conditions.
Illinois – prohibited for nearly all vehicles; only rural mail carriers and persons with disabilities in rural areas may use, 15 November – 1 April.
Minnesota – rural mail carriers and non-residents (maximum of 30 days) only, 1 November – 15 April; The non-resident exemption does not extend to out-of-state students and non-residents employed in Minnesota.
Wisconsin – only mail carriers, school buses and emergency vehicles, 15 November – 1 April; vehicles registered in states which permit studded tires may use in Wisconsin for up to 30 days during the same window.
All other states and provinces allow seasonal use of studded snow tires.
Alabama, Alaska, Florida, Louisiana, Michigan and Texas – only rubber studs are allowed.
Alaska – 16 September – 30 April north of 60 degrees north latitude (including Anchorage and Fairbanks); 1 October – 14 April south of 60 degrees north latitude (including Juneau).
Idaho – firefighting vehicles may use year-round; all other vehicles may use 1 October – 30 April.
New Brunswick - Vehicles may use between 15 October - 1 May.
Newfoundland & Labrador - Vehicles may use 1 November - 30 April.
North Dakota – school buses may use year-round; all other vehicles may use 15 October – 15 April.
Nova Scotia - Fire department vehicles may use year-round; all other vehicles may use 15 October - 31 May.
Prince Edward Island - All vehicles may use between 1 October - 31 May.
South Dakota – school buses and municipal fire vehicles may use year-round; all other vehicles may use 1 October – 30 April.

See also 
 Snow chains
 Snow socks

References

Tires
Snow
Ice in transportation
Inclement weather management
Automotive safety
Vehicle safety technologies
Tyres